Bob Frey is an American football coach and former player.  From 1994 to 2002, Frey was the head coach at MacMurray College in Jacksonville, Illinois, leading the Highlanders to two NCAA Division III playoff appearance. He later served as the head football coach at Tri-State University—now known as Trine University—in Angola, Indiana from 2003 to 2005.

Head coaching record

References

External links
 Kentucky Christian profile
 MacMurray Hall of Fame profile

Year of birth missing (living people)
Living people
Anna Maria Amcats football coaches
Kansas Wesleyan Coyotes football coaches
Kentucky Christian Knights football coaches
Lindenwood–Belleville Lynx football coaches
MacMurray Highlanders football coaches
Manchester Spartans football coaches
Mount Union Purple Raiders football coaches
Mount Union Purple Raiders football players
Olivet Comets football coaches
Trine Thunder football coaches
High school football coaches in Ohio